Events from the year 1884 in Denmark.

Incumbents
 Monarch – Christian IX
 Prime minister – J. B. S. Estrup

Events

 31 May – The Tommerup–Assens railway line opens on Funen.
 25 June – The 1884Danish Folketing election takes place.
 10–16 August – The 8th International Medical Congress opens in Copenhagen. The participants include Peter Ludvig Panum (President), Louis Pasteur, Rudolf Ludwig Virchow and James Paget.
 3 October – The fire of the 2nd Christiansborg Palace begins.

Births
 9 April – Peter Andersen, gymnast (died 1954)
 18 March – Oluf Høst, painter (died 1966)
 28 May – Harald Krenchel, fencer (died 1922)
 30 June – Svend Rindomm screenwriter and actor (died 1960)
 30 September – Carl Pedersen, rower (died 1968)
 16 December – Jonathan Leunbach, doctor (died 1955)

Deaths
 9 August – Annestine Beyer, reform pedagogue and pioneer on women's education (born 1795)
 19 December  Alfred Benzon, pharmacist and industrialist (born 1823)

References

 
1880s in Denmark
Denmark
Years of the 19th century in Denmark